"Jhanjar" is a song by Indian singer and lyricist Karan Aujla. The song was written by Aujla and music was composed by Desi Crew. The music video was directed by Tru Makers. Produced by Sandeep Rehaan under Rehaan Records, the song was released on 18 January 2020, on occasion of Aujla's birthday.

The song hit various YouTube music charts upon its release. It was ranked No. 26 on Global and No. 8 on India YouTube weekly music charts.

Music video 

The music video of the song was shot in January 2020 in India by Tru Makers(Dilsher Singh and Khushpal Singh). It starred Aveera Singh Masson in female lead. The music video was released on 18 January 2020 on YouTube by Rehaan Records. It was viewed over five million times within twenty-four hours of its release. Also, it topped the trending lists in Australia, Canada, and India. As of January 2021, it has been viewed over 120 million times on YouTube.

References 

2020 songs
Punjabi music